The 2022 Washington House of Representatives elections took place as part of the biennial United States elections on November 8, 2022. Washington state voters elected state representatives in all 98 seats of the House, electing 2 state representatives in each of the 49 Washington state legislative districts. State representatives serve two-year terms in the Washington House of Representatives.

Following the previous election in 2020, Democrats held a 57-to-41 seat majority over Republicans.

Retirements

Democrats 

 Eileen Cody
 Emily Wicks
 Javier Valdez
 Jesse Johnson
 Kirsten Harris-Talley
 Laurie Dolan
 Mike Sells
 Noel Frame
 Pat Sullivan
 Sharon Shewmake
 Steve Kirby

Republicans 

 Bob McCaslin Jr.
 Brad Klippert
 Drew MacEwen
 Jeremie Dufault
 Jesse Young
 Larry Hoff
 Matt Boehnke
 Vicki Kraft

Predictions

Overview 

Source:

Summary of Results by House District 
** Incumbent did not seek re-election.

Detailed Results by House District

Note: Washington uses a top two primary system. The vote totals may include write-in candidates. Official primary results can be obtained here

District 1

District 2

District 3

District 4

District 5

District 6

District 7

District 8

District 9

District 10

District 11

District 12

District 13

District 14

District 15

District 16

District 17

District 18

District 19

District 20

District 21

District 22

District 23

District 24

District 25

District 26

District 27

District 28

District 29

District 30

District 31

District 32

District 33

District 34

District 35

District 36

District 37

District 38

District 39

District 40

District 41

District 42

District 43

District 44

District 45

District 46

District 47

District 48

District 49

See also
2022 Washington State Senate election
2022 United States House of Representatives elections in Washington

References

External links
 
 
  (State affiliate of the U.S. League of Women Voters)
 

Washington House
2022 Washington (state) elections
Washington House of Representatives elections